Dorila Antommarchi de Rojas (1850s – 1923) published numerous poems and sometimes used the pseudonym Colombiana.  All her poems appear in various anthologies. Her sisters, Hortensia Antommarchi and Elmira Antommarchi, were also published poets.

She died in her native town of Cúcuta, Colombia.

See also

 François Carlo Antommarchi

References

1850s births
1923 deaths
Colombian people of French descent
Year of birth unknown
Date of death unknown
Colombian women poets
20th-century Colombian writers
20th-century Colombian women writers
19th-century Colombian women writers
19th-century Colombian writers
People from Cúcuta